Humorist and political satirist Madeleine Begun Kane ("Mad Kane") won the 2008 Robert Benchley Society Humor Award (Bob Newhart was the finals judge) and is a National Society of Newspaper Columnists award winner. Her humor and essays have been published in numerous newspapers, print magazines, and web sites and in many anthologies and text books (including Laughing Matters; Life’s A Stitch: The Best of Contemporary Women’s Humor; Funny Times: The Best of the Best American Humor; Jest Patriotic; Cash In On Laughter; Big Bush Lies; I Killed June Cleaver; Minutes of the Lead Pencil Club; Healer {Archetypes of the Collective Unconscious Volume 2}; and The Contemporary Reader .) She is also a recovering lawyer, a funny contracts and limerick writer, and a musician whose political song parodies were popular "sing-alongs" at anti-Bush demonstrations.

Mad Kane's humor about marriage, work, money, travel, cars, politics, the media, and other topics has appeared in numerous publications including Family Circle Magazine, First For Women, America Online, Chicago Tribune, Philadelphia Inquirer, Miami Herald, Houston Chronicle, and the New York Times.

Dubya’s Dayly Diary (her ghostwritten satirical White House diary of George W. Bush) garnered many awards and favorable press, including USAToday Hot Site of the Day and Fun Site of the Week,  About.com parody awards, Maxim Magazine’s Hot99, Shift Magazine’s 100 Sites We Love, Political Site of the Day, and The Guardian’s Best George Bush Websites. 

Madeleine Begun Kane studied at the Eastman School of Music, the Aspen Music Festival, California Institute of the Arts, and St. John's University School of Law.  She earned her B.F.A in music performance (oboe) from Cal Arts in 1971 and her J.D. from St. John's University School of Law in 1979.

Mad Kane lives in Bayside, Queens with husband Mark Kane, and she publishes the humor site MadKane.com

External links
 Official Website of Madeleine Begun Kane
 Robert Benchley Society Humor Award
 Shop and Learn by Madeleine Begun Kane from the New York Times
 Laughing Matters
 The Contemporary Reader

References

 Robert Benchley Society Press Release
  Profile of Madeleine Begun Kane in Queens Tribune (scroll down the page to "It's Bush's Bayside Ghostwriter?")
  USA Today names Madeleine Begun Kane's Dubya's Dayly Diary  Fun Site of the Week 
 Radio Interview with Madeleine Begun Kane
 Interview With Madeleine Begun Kane
 AAN AltWeekly Awards Judges Bio List

American humorists
Aspen Music Festival and School alumni
Living people
People from Bayside, Queens
Year of birth missing (living people)